Nikolay Alexandrovich Vtorov ( – 20 May 1918) was a Russian industrialist. According to a 2006 Forbes study, which excluded the ruling House of Romanov, he held the title of Russia's wealthiest man on the eve of World War I, owning an estimated 60 million rubles in gold.

Biography

Life and career
Nikolay owed his fortune to his father, Alexander Vtorov, a successful Irkutsk businessman who set up a trans-Siberian retail shopping network. Upon his death in 1911, Alexander Vtorov's net worth was estimated at 13.6 million roubles; it passed to Nikolay and his lesser-known brother, who had lived in Moscow since 1897. Nikolay Vtorov used his father's fortune to take over numerous banks and manufacturing companies; his aggressive takeover policies earned him the nickname of "the Russian Morgan". He has been called "the first to break the age-old traditions in favor of a rational and intelligent organization of commercial business."

Upon Russia's entry into World War I, Vtorov became one of the major military contractors for the tsarist government, amassing huge state subsidies to build new manufacturing plants in central Russia; he was de facto defense industry manager for the whole of the Moscow region.

Death and legacy

Vtorov decided to stay in Russia after the 1917 Revolution and pledged loyalty to the Bolshevik regime. Less than a year later, in May 1918, he was assassinated; the exact circumstances of his death remain unknown. He was buried in the cemetery of the now-defunct Skorbyashensky Monastery in Moscow.

Many of Vtorov's largest wartime projects, inherited by the Soviets, are still in operation:
 City of Elektrostal (former Zatishye) foundries and defense plants
 City of Noginsk (former Bogorodsk) foundries and defense plants
 Zavod Imeni Likhacheva (Originally AMO truck company) defunct since 2012. Legacy; MSTs6 AMOZIL company
Lesser-known Vtorov plants are still operating all over the city of Moscow. Many have been converted into offices and shopping malls.

Vtorov's former residence, Spaso House, was seized by the Soviet government in 1918 and has since housed the United States Ambassador to the Soviet Union (1933–1991) and United States Ambassador to the Russian Federation (1991–present).

See also
List of unsolved murders

References

External links

 

1866 births
1918 deaths
People from Irkutsk
People from Irkutsk Governorate
Russian industrialists
Russian murder victims
People murdered in the Soviet Union
Unsolved murders in the Soviet Union